Iftikhar Ahmed (born 14 December 1984) is a Pakistani cricketer who played for Faisalabad.

Having played for Kasur in inter-district cricket for several seasons, Ahmed made his first-class debut for Faisalabad in the 2014–15 Quaid-e-Azam Trophy Silver League, playing in four of the team's six matches in the competition. He also played in three List A matches in the President's Silver Cup One Day. After Faisalabad failed to qualify for first-class cricket the following season, he continued to play for the team in the Quaid-e-Azam Trophy GradeII competition. He did not play in 2016–17 as Faisalabad won the Quaid-e-Azam Trophy GradeII to gain promotion, however he returned the following season to play in five of Faisalabad's seven matches in the 2017–18 Quaid-e-Azam Trophy.

References

External links
 

1984 births
Living people
Pakistani cricketers
Faisalabad cricketers
People from Kasur District